Take It Greasy is the debut studio album to be released by Australian 1950's retro band Ol' 55. The album peaked at number 3 on the Australian Kent Music Report and was certified 3× platinum. At the time, 1950s music and culture had gained a newfound interest in Australia amongst a younger generation, largely due to the influence of the very popular TV show Happy Days and earlier investigations into doo-wop by the group Daddy Cool.

Track listing

Charts

Weekly charts

Year-end charts

See also
 List of top 25 albums for 1976 in Australia

References

1976 debut albums
Ol' 55 (band) albums
Mushroom Records albums